Fearless Hyena Part II is a 1983 Hong Kong martial arts action film directed by Chan Chuen, and starring Jackie Chan. It was the sequel to the first part The Fearless Hyena.

Background
When film producer Willie Chan left the Lo Wei Motion Picture Company to join Golden Harvest, he advised Jackie Chan to decide for himself whether or not to stay with Lo Wei. Chan began work on the film, but then broke his contract and joined Golden Harvest. This prompted Lo to blackmail him with triads, and to blame Willie Chan for his star's departure. The dispute was resolved with the help of fellow actor and director Jimmy Wang Yu, allowing Chan to stay with Golden Harvest.

In order to complete the film, Lo hired stunt doubles to take Chan's place in the remainder of the film, and used alternative takes and reused footage from the first film. Chan mentions that the end product of the film was so bad that he even tried to stop it from being released by going to court, but Lo released the film regardless.

Plot
Two cousins, Cheng Lung (Jackie Chan) and Tung (Austin Wai), get together to avenge the death of their fathers, who were killed by two rivals.

Cast
Jackie Chan as Cheng Lung (also archive footage)
Dean Shek as Shek Earth / Jaws Four
Yam Sai-koon as Heaven Devil (Heaven and Earth Society Leader)
Kwan Yung-moon as Earth Devil
James Tien - Ching Chun-nam / Old Chan
Chan Wai-lau as Ching Chun-pei
Austin Wai as Tung
Jacky Chang as Cheng Lung (doubling for Jackie Chan)

Box office
The film grossed HK$1,983,793 at the Hong Kong box office. In France, the film sold 59,789 tickets in 1986.

See also
 Jackie Chan filmography
 List of Hong Kong films
 List of martial arts films

References

External links
 Fearless Hyena Part II at Hong Kong Cinemagic
 
 

1983 films
1980s action comedy films
1980s martial arts comedy films
Hong Kong action comedy films
Hong Kong martial arts comedy films
Kung fu films
1980s Hong Kong films